The Calhoun City School District is a public school district in Gordon County, Georgia, United States, based in Calhoun. It serves the communities of Calhoun and Gordon County.

Schools
The Calhoun City School District has two elementary schools, one middle school, and one high school.

Elementary schools
Calhoun Elementary School
Calhoun Primary School

Middle school
Calhoun Middle School

High school
Calhoun High School

References

External links

School districts in Georgia (U.S. state)
Education in Gordon County, Georgia
1901 establishments in Georgia (U.S. state)
School districts established in 1901